Hemiculter krempfi is a species of ray-finned fish in the genus Hemiculter. It is known only from the Cai River in Khanh Hoa Province and the Da Rang River in  Phu Yen Province of central Vietnam. Here it is found mainly over sand substrates and is infrequently encountered in fish markets.

References 

 

Hemiculter
Fish described in 1938